A Time to Love and a Time to Die is a 1958 Eastmancolor CinemaScope drama war film directed by Douglas Sirk and starring John Gavin and Liselotte Pulver. Based on the book by German author Erich Maria Remarque and set on the Eastern Front and in Nazi Germany, it tells the story of a young German soldier who is revolted by the conduct of the German army in the Soviet Union and actions of the National Socialist German Workers Party in the homefront.

According to Variety magazine the film"was regarded by company's exec echelon at the outset as fine drama and wham money maker but the [box office] disappointment is now ascribed to lack of names."

Plot
As a German infantry unit retreats across Russia in the spring of 1944, Ernst Graeber's conscience is revolted by the execution of captured civilians. Given his first furlough for over two years, he returns to find his family home bombed and his parents gone. Calling at the house of the family doctor for information, the daughter Elizabeth tells him her father is in a concentration camp because of an unwise remark. Allied bombing continues by day and by night.

An old school friend who is now the local head of the Nazi Party offers Ernst accommodation, food, drink, and women. But he prefers to stay with fellow soldiers billeted in a hospital and to get closer to Elizabeth. The two go to the one restaurant still open, which is destroyed that night by bombs.

Each alone in the world, they agree to an immediate marriage, but Elizabeth's family home is flattened by bombs and they take refuge in a ruined church. Elizabeth gets a summon to Gestapo headquarters, which Ernst intercepts and attends as her husband. He is given her father's ashes, which he secretly buries in the churchyard. Visiting his former teacher, who helps Jews on the run, he is told there is no excuse for the Wehrmacht's war crimes against Russians and of the German state against its own citizens. Ernst and Elizabeth find lodgings for the rest of his leave.

Returning to the front, he finds a fellow soldier who is an ardent Nazi about to shoot captured civilians. As the two are alone, he kills the other soldier and tells the civilians to flee. One of them picks up the dead man's rifle and shoots Ernst dead. He had not finished reading a letter from Elizabeth, saying that she was expecting their child.

Cast

 John Gavin as Ernst Graeber
 Liselotte Pulver as Elizabeth Kruse, later Graeber
 Jock Mahoney as Immerman
 Don DeFore as Hermann Boettcher
 Keenan Wynn as Reuter
 Erich Maria Remarque as Professor Pohlmann
 Dieter Borsche as Captain Rahe
 Barbara Rütting as Woman Guerrilla
 Thayer David as Oscar Binding
 Charles Régnier as Joseph
 Dorothea Wieck as Frau Lieser
 Kurt Meisel as Heini
 Agnes Windeck as Frau Witte
 Clancy Cooper as Sauer
 John van Dreelen as Political Officer
 Klaus Kinski as Gestapo Lieutenant
 Alice Treff as Frau Langer
 Alexander Engel as Mad Air Raid Warden
 Jim Hutton as Hirschland (as Dana J. Hutton)
 Bengt Lindström as Steinbrenner

Production
Remarque met Sirk in 1954 and the director persuaded the writer to adapt his own novel for the screen. ("I found him an extraordinarily understanding and capable man", said Remarque. "He knew what he wanted to do with my book.") Sirk's son, actor Klaus Detlef Sierck (1925–1944), died in the Ukraine as a soldier of the Panzer-Grenadier-Division Großdeutschland when he was 18 years old.

Universal decided to cast two relative unknowns in the lead. As studio executive Al Daff said:
 At one stage Ann Harding was going to play a role.

Filming took place in West Berlin, which Sirk had fled over 20 years before and the US Army Europe training area at Grafenwöhr. Interiors were shot at CCC Film's Spandau Studios in Berlin. The film's sets were designed by the art directors Alexander Golitzen and Alfred Sweeney. Gavin was accompanied by his wife who he had just married and they used the movie as an opportunity to honeymoon.

The musical score was composed by Miklós Rózsa on loanout from M-G-M, where he had been the primary composer for over a decade.

Universal sent a screen test of Gavin to critics in advance of the film's release. Hedda Hopper saw a preview and predicted that Gavin will "take the public by storm and so will the picture, which should also put its co-star, Lilo Pulver in the top ten."

Universal publicly claimed that the film cost $5 million but Universal president Milton Rackmil denied that they had ever spent that amount on a film.

Reception
The Los Angeles Times wrote the film wasn't as good as All Quiet on the Western Front but was "vivid, sometimes brutally shocking and, less often, emotionally moving."

The film is recognized by American Film Institute in these lists:
 2002: AFI's 100 Years...100 Passions – Nominated

Box office
The film was expected to be Universal's biggest film of the year and was, with theatrical rentals of $1.6 million in the United States and Canada. The film was one of the most popular of the year in France. Kinematograph Weekly listed it as being "in the money" at the British box office in 1958.

Awards
Nominated
 Academy Award: Best Sound Recording (Leslie I. Carey) (1959)
 Berlin Film Festival: Golden Bear (1958)

References

External links

1958 films
1958 drama films
1950s war drama films
American war drama films
Films directed by Douglas Sirk
Films based on works by Erich Maria Remarque
Films scored by Miklós Rózsa
Films set in 1944
Films about Nazi Germany
Films based on German novels
Films shot at Spandau Studios
Anti-war films about World War II
Eastern Front of World War II films
Universal Pictures films
1950s English-language films
1950s American films